Sakko i Vantsetti  is a village in Bakhmut Raion (district) in Donetsk Oblast of eastern Ukraine.

The village is named after the anarchists Sacco and Vanzetti, who were controversially convicted of murdering a paymaster and security guard at a shoe factory in the United States and sentenced to death in the 1920s. Soviet propaganda celebrated Sacco and Vanzetti as "unjustly accused" proletarians and revolutionaries.

History

Amid the Russian invasion of Ukraine, on February 1, 2023, Russian oligarch Yevgeny Prigozhin claimed his Wagner Group paramilitary fighters had captured the village, posting a photograph purporting to show 4 of his soldiers posing in front of "the only surviving house in Sakko i Vantsetti."

Demographics
The 1989 Census in the Ukrainian SSR of the Soviet Union recorded a total population of 19 in Sakko i Vantsetti, 12 men and 7 women. The population declined by the time of the first independent Ukrainian Census of 2001, which recorded 3 inhabitants in the village.

References

External links

Villages in Bakhmut Raion